Ülemistejärve is a subdistrict in the district of Kesklinn (Midtown), Tallinn, the capital of Estonia.

Subdistrict is named after Ülemiste Lake.

References

External links

Subdistricts of Tallinn
Kesklinn, Tallinn